Ronald Stanley Thresher (31 December 1930 – 2 May 2013), known as Ron Thresher, was an English cricketer who played five first-class cricket matches between 1957 and 1958.

Thresher was born at Tonbridge in Kent and educated at Maidstone Grammar School where he played cricket. A fast bowler, Thresher was described as a bowler who "often terrorised schoolboy batsmen". He pursued a career as a banker in Coutts, playing cricket for Private Banks Cricket Club and, as a result of his performances, in 1952 was selected for the Club Cricket Conference, winning his CCC cap in 1956.

Thresher made his debut for Kent County Cricket Club's Second XI in 1957 and, after taking eight wickets against Middlesex Seconds XI at Lord's, he made his first-class debut for the county against Yorkshire at Tunbridge Wells later the same season. He played once more for the Kent First XI during the year and made three first-class appearances for DR Jardine's XI, one in 1957 and two in 1958. He continued to play for Kent's Second XI in the Minor Counties Championship and Second XI Championship until 1959 and remained active in club cricket during the 1960s.

As well as playing cricket, Thresher also played rugby union for Harlequins. He died at Dover in 2013 aged 82.

References

External links
 

1930 births
2013 deaths
English cricketers
Kent cricketers
People from Tonbridge
Sportspeople from Kent
D. R. Jardine's XI cricketers